The following is a list of FCC-licensed radio stations in the U.S. state of Maine, which can be sorted by their call signs, frequencies, cities of license, licensees, and programming formats.

List of radio stations

Defunct
 WKZX
 WMNE
 WNSW
 WVOM

References

 
Maine
Radio